Kostadin Katsimerski (born 7 February 1987 in Blagoevgrad) is a Bulgarian footballer who last played as a midfielder for Pirin Razlog.

References

External links
 
 Profile at Sportal

1987 births
Living people
Sportspeople from Blagoevgrad
Bulgarian footballers
PFC Pirin Blagoevgrad players
PFC Belasitsa Petrich players
OFC Pirin Blagoevgrad players
PFC Minyor Pernik players
FC Septemvri Simitli players
FC Bansko players
FC Pirin Razlog players
First Professional Football League (Bulgaria) players
Second Professional Football League (Bulgaria) players
Association football midfielders